Central Black Earth Economic Region (tr.: Tsentralno-Chernozyomny ekonomichesky rayon), sometimes called Central Chernozem or Central Chernozemic economic region, is one of 12 economic regions of Russia. This region accounted for almost 3 per cent of the national GRP in 2008.

Composition
Belgorod Oblast
Kursk Oblast
Lipetsk Oblast
Tambov Oblast
Voronezh Oblast
All are in the Central Federal District.

References

Economic regions of Russia
Chernozemye